General elections were held in Grenada on 24 August 1967. The result was a victory for the Grenada United Labour Party, which won seven of the ten seats. Voter turnout was 77.1%.

Results

References

Elections in Grenada
1967 in Grenada
Grenada
August 1967 events in North America